is the 37th single by Japanese entertainer Akina Nakamori. Written by Hiromi Mori and Juni, the single was released on September 23, 1998, by Gauss Entertainment under the This One label. It was also the lead single from her 19th studio album Will.

Background 
"Tomadoi" was used as the theme song of the TBS drama series . The B-side, "Good-bye My Tears", was used as the theme song of the TBS drama series .

Chart performance 
"Tomadoi" peaked at No. 40 on Oricon's weekly singles chart and sold over 10,400 copies.

Track listing 
All music is arranged by Max Brightstone.

Charts

References

External links 
 
 

1998 singles
1998 songs
Akina Nakamori songs
Japanese-language songs
Japanese television drama theme songs